The John N. Huttig Estate is a historic home in Orlando, Florida. It was located at 435 Peachtree Road. On January 21, 1993, it was added to the U.S. National Register of Historic Places. The home was designed by architect James Gamble Rogers II and completed in 1935.

References

External links
 Orange County listings at National Register of Historic Places
 Orange County listings at Florida's Office of Cultural and Historical Programs

Buildings and structures in Orlando, Florida
Houses on the National Register of Historic Places in Florida
History of Orlando, Florida
National Register of Historic Places in Orange County, Florida
Houses in Orange County, Florida